Aquicoccus is a Gram-negative and aerobic genus of bacteria from the family of Rhodobacteraceae with one known species (Aquicoccus porphyridii). Aquicoccus porphyridii has been isolated from the alga Porphyridium marinum from Korea.

References

Rhodobacteraceae
Bacteria genera
Monotypic bacteria genera